Robert Parker (October 14, 1930 – January 19, 2020) was an American R&B singer and musician. His sole hit was "Barefootin'" (1966), and he is considered a one-hit wonder.

Life and career 
Robert Parker, Jr. was born in Mobile, Alabama, to Robert and Leana Parker. He grew up in New Orleans, Louisiana, and started his career as a saxophonist, playing with Professor Longhair on his hit "Mardi Gras in New Orleans" in 1949.

During the 1950s, Parker played alto and tenor saxophone with many of the most popular New Orleans performers, appearing on records by Eddie Bo, Huey "Piano" Smith, Earl King, James Booker, Ernie K-Doe, Tommy Ridgley, Fats Domino and others in New Orleans, and backed up visiting R & B artists including Solomon Burke, Lloyd Price, Jerry Butler and Otis Redding.

By 1958, he had started recording solo, having a local hit with the instrumental "All Nite Long" a year later. In 1965 he signed for Nola Records, and teaming up with producer Wardell Quezergue had his biggest hit with "Barefootin' ", which he had written. It sold over one million copies, made the pop charts in Britain and elsewhere, and was awarded a gold disc by the RIAA. In 1967, he had another minor R&B hit with "Tip Toe" (no.48, R&B chart). Although he continued to record, he failed to repeat his success in terms of sales, and his recording career effectively ended in the mid 1970s. However, he continued to perform and tour for many more years, remaining especially popular in the UK.

In April 2007, in recognition of his contributions to Louisiana and national music, Parker was inducted into the Louisiana Music Hall of Fame. On July 19, 2009, he performed "Barefootin'" and "Where the Action Is" in a 'Tribute to Wardell Quezergue', a concert at Alice Tully Hall at the Lincoln Center in New York.

Parker died on January 19, 2020, at his home in Roseland, Louisiana, at the age of 89 of natural causes.

Discography

Studio albums 
Barefootin''' (1966) – No. 16 Billboard Top R&B/Hip-Hop Albums

 Compilation albums 
 Get Ta Steppin' (1987)
 Barefootin' Plus 13 More Golden Classics (1987)
 The Wardell Quezerque Sessions (2002)
 An Introduction to Robert Parker'' (2006)

Singles

See also 

 List of 1960's one-hit wonders in the US

References

External links 
 

1930 births
2020 deaths
African-American musicians
American rhythm and blues musicians
Musicians from Mobile, Alabama
Rhythm and blues musicians from New Orleans
Imperial Records artists
20th-century African-American people
21st-century African-American people